"Solid Gold" is a song by Australian singer-songwriter Delta Goodrem, released on 18 September 2020. An acoustic version and remixes were released in October 2020.

Background and composition
In an interview with Grazia on the day of "Solid Gold"'s release, Goodrem described the song as an "empowering song about reminding someone of your worth and strength; a song you sing along to with your mates and jam out to in the car with all the windows down", and that "every instrument was recorded live and we really wanted to capture that upbeat, fun, retro sound, but with a modern feel." She also stated "at the very core, 'Solid Gold' is an uplifting and empowering message reminding someone who has taken you for granted of your worth and strength".

Reception
Jessica Over wrote for NME that "Solid Gold" "features rich instrumentation and an upbeat melody in a glimpse of what to expect from Goodrem's currently untitled upcoming LP." Australian entertainment website Scenestr described it "fun, upbeat, fierce anthem", and TotalNtertainment noted that the song "[draws] upon rich nostalgic tones similar to Fleetwood Mac", and that "'Solid Gold' instantly ignites a sense of joy through live instruments and a swirling harmonic chorus, making it impossible not to feel good."

Track listing

References

 

2020 singles
2020 songs
Delta Goodrem songs